Indian Heaven is a volcanic field in Skamania County in the state of Washington, in the United States. Midway between Mount St. Helens and Mount Adams, the field dates from the Pleistocene to the early Holocene epoch. It trends north to south and is dominated by six small shield volcanoes; these shields are topped by small spatter and cinder cones, and the field includes a number of subglacial volcanoes and tuyas.

Indian Heaven features both polygenetic and monogenetic volcanic activity; many of its volcanoes have only erupted once before coming extinct, while others have erupted several times. Approximately 50 eruptive centers lie within the Indian Heaven field, which also has approximately 40 lava flows. The field's eruptive output totals , with sporadic activity taking place for the past 700,000 years. The last volcanic activity in the field produced a large cinder cone, Big Lava Bed, as well as a voluminous lava and scoria flows about 9,000 years ago. Future activity is possible, though the Volcano Hazards Program directed by the United States Geological Survey considers Indian Heaven's volcanic threat level to be low.

The volcanic field is surrounded by the Indian Heaven Wilderness, a protected wilderness area within the Gifford Pinchot National Forest, supporting diverse flora and fauna. The local area has been inhabited by Native American populations for about 10,000 years, and the name Indian Heaven derives from the indigenous name for the vicinity. A popular recreation destination, the wilderness offers a number of trails, as well as more than 150 lakes for fishing, swimming, and boating.

Geography 

Located in Skamania County in the state of Washington, Indian Heaven volcanic field is part of the High Cascades, an eastern segment of the Cascade Range, which trends north–south. Formed towards the end of the Pleistocene Epoch, these mountains are underlain by more ancient volcanoes that subsided due to parallel north–south faulting in the surrounding region.

The Simcoe Mountains volcanic field is located to the east. To the southwest lies a diffuse volcanic belt of at least 22 volcanic centers,  in length, that runs in a southeast-trending direction and includes Marble Mountain, Bare Mountain, West Crater, and Trout Creek Hill.

Wilderness 
It includes subalpine meadows, the volcanic field and a number of other volcanic features, more than 150 lakes, and forests. Created in 1984 by the Washington Wilderness Bill, it sits between Mount Adams and the Columbia River Gorge, a canyon of the Columbia River. Part of the Gifford Pinchot National Forest, the wilderness area includes  of the Pacific Crest Trail, which traverses it from north to south, as well as seven other tributary trails, that form a  network of trails. The area is relatively inaccessible, as roads are covered by snow until June annually though snow melts by mid-July in most years, permitting visitors in the fall season.

Ecology 
The plateau that contains the Indian Heaven Wilderness features forests, which are predominantly made up of Pacific silver fir, noble fir, and subalpine fir trees, though there are also Western red cedars, mountain hemlock, grand firs, and Engelmann spruce. Other flora found in the vicinity include an understory of huckleberry plants and beargrass, in addition to colorful wildflowers; vine maples; flowering plants such as blueberry, heather, vanilla leaf, and false hellebore; and aromatic wintergreen. Many of the area's lakes get stocked with trout species like cutthroat, rainbow, and brook trout. Amphibians such as frogs can be found in the wilderness, while terrestrial animals in the area include deer, elk, and American black bears. Because of the abundance of mosquitoes within the vicinity, Indian Heaven is sometimes informally referred to as Insect Heaven.

Human history 

Indian Heaven and the surrounding wilderness area have played an important role in local Native American life for about 10,000 years, and the vicinity was originally called Sahalee Tyee by native peoples, which loosely translates to Indian Heaven. The Sawtooth Berry Fields, known globally for their huckleberries, burned during the late 1890s and again in 1902. Later fires helped maintain the fields by drying their berries. From 1902 to the mid-1920s, local tribes including the Yakama, Klickitat, Wasco-Wishram, and Umatilla, as well as Native American groups from Montana and Wyoming gathered in the Indian Heaven area during the summers for annual huckleberry feasts. During these gatherings, they celebrated, traded, and performed rituals; they also raced horses, played various games, constructed baskets, dried meat, tanned hides, and fished in the local lakes. In 1932, the Yakama Nation and the United States Forest Service agreed to set aside a portion of the Berry Fields for exclusive Indian use; the harvest remains an important local tradition. Trees within the area have scars from where their bark was peeled for wood to make baskets. The area is also rich with large game animals and supports a number of roots and tuber plant species.

Geology 

The area near the Indian Heaven vicinity is composed of Western Cascade rocks from the Eocene to Miocene including andesite, tuffs, mud flows, pyroclastic flow deposits, and other volcaniclastic materials, as well as High Cascade rocks that date from between the Pliocene and Holocene epochs. Strata of rock underlying the area has been deformed to create faults, fractures (separations in geologic formation), volcanic igneous intrusions, and a gradual, dipping syncline that trends north to south. The Indian Heaven field resides within the syncline's trough, and it consists of High Cascade rocks, which are far less altered than the surrounding rock strata. Similar to other Cascade volcanoes, the Indian Heaven volcanoes were fed by magma chambers produced by the subduction of the Juan de Fuca tectonic plate under the western edge of the North American tectonic plate.

Indian Heaven consists of several, overlapping shield volcanoes that run along a line from Sawtooth Mountain at the north to Red Mountain to the south, as well as cinder cones, lava flows, and spatter cones (low, steep-sided hills or mounds that consist of welded lava fragments). Roughly half of these vents mark a mountainous highland,  in length, which runs parallel to the north–south trend of the Cascade Arc in southern Washington state.

Most of the volcanoes that comprise the Indian Heaven field are monogenetic, only erupting once before becoming extinct. The rest are polygenetic shield volcanoes. Basalt composition varies from low-potassium high-alumina olivine tholeiite to calc-alkaline, shoshonite, and alkaline intraplate compositions, though olivine-bearing basalt with different amounts of porphyritic plagioclase dominates. Volcanoes within the field have produced smaller amounts of basaltic andesite and andesite with silicon dioxide compositions up to 59 percent, though dacite is not very common among Indian Heaven eruptive products. Unlike Mount St. Helens, the Indian Heaven field has generated large volumes of basalt but has not caused extensive crustal melting. Most of the lava flows produced by the field have been pāhoehoe, featuring smaller percentages of block flows and ʻaʻā flows.

Indian Heaven has been significantly altered through glacial erosion, including at least four major periods of glaciation. During the Hayden Creek Glaciation from 190,000 to 130,000 years ago, the Lewis River glacier advanced from Mount Adams to fill the Lewis River canyon, partly overlapping the Indian Heaven volcanic field. An ice cap originating at the northern end of the field also spread during this glacial era.

Eruptive history and potential hazards 

One of Indian Heaven's vents produced a large effusive eruption about 9,000 years ago, forming the Big Lava Bed, which consisted of basaltic lava. Ultimately, the flow extended  from its initial source vent, an unnamed cinder cone. It came within  of the Columbia River. Another, more ancient lava flow that was especially fluid encompassed the Trout Lake area and extended several miles south, also nearing the Columbia River. Highly voluminous, it also features lava tubes. The eruptive units from the field show normal residual magnetism, suggesting that they were all formed less than 780,000 years ago, with the exception of lava within Gifford Peak's eroded core.

The volcanic field also features a number of Pleistocene subglacial volcanoes, many of which formed móbergs, flat-topped peaks generated by subglacial eruptions. These mountains, such as Crazy Hills, formed pillow-like shapes when their lava interacted with ice or meltwater. The field also has tuyas, such as Lone Buttle, which formed as flat and steep volcanic cones created by lava that erupted through glaciers or ice sheets. However, Lone Butte has since undergone significant glacial erosion, losing about half of its original structure.

Activity at the volcanic field has occurred sporadically for the past 700,000 years. Therefore, it remains likely that volcanoes from the field will erupt in the future, generating voluminous lava flows. Nonetheless, the Volcano Hazards Program directed by the United States Geological Survey lists Indian Heaven's volcanic threat level as "Low/Very Low". To assess threats from possible lava flows at Indian Heaven or at nearby Mount Adams, geologists from the United States Geological Survey headed by W. E. Scott determined its mean burial rate in 1995, calculated as the lava volume erupted per unit time divided by the area of the lava field. They found that Indian Heaven's average burial rate was low, but noted that Indian Heaven "has had a large lava flow in the past 10,000 years." Estimating the probability of lava flows from Indian Heaven covering a certain point in the zone surrounding the field, the geologists arrived at a range between one in 100,000 to one in a million.

Major vents 
The Global Volcanism Program of the Smithsonian Institution lists a number of major vents at Indian Heaven, including the Big Lava Bed pyroclastic cone, produced by the most recent eruption in the field; the Bird Mountain, East Crater, Gifford Peak, Lemei Rock, Red Mountain, and Sawtooth Mountain shield volcanoes; and the Lone Butte tuya volcano. The Big Lava Bed pyroclastic cinder cone has a smooth slope, and produced the Big Lava Bed flow, which represents the newest eruptive activity within the entire Indian Heaven field.

Recreation 

Within the Indian Heaven Wilderness, visitors can fish in lakes and ponds, hike, backpack, ride horses, and view wildlife.
Following the Indian Heaven Trail to Deep Trail and then Lemei Lake Trail, it passes through meadows and lakes to join the Pacific Crest Trail before it returns to the Cultus Creek campground where it starts. However, trails can vary in difficulty for horseback riders and hikers.

The Lake Wapiki trail,  in length, gains  in elevation and provides scenic views of Mount Adams and Mount Rainier. A moderate hike, it offers views of lakes, ponds, meadows, and forests, as well as access to popular fishing lakes like Dee Lake, Heather Lake, Thomas Lake, and Eunice Lake. These lakes are also popular swimming spots, particularly among hikers with children. Blue Lake was carved by glacial motion.

One of the most popular camping spots is the Goose Lake Campground, which is frequented by fishermen, boaters, and swimmers. Operated by the United States Forest Service, the campground remains open from July through October. A designated camp site near Thomas and Blue Lakes within the wilderness was created by wilderness managers for the Gifford Pinchot National Forest, with the hope that it would mitigate resource damage in high use area and focus visitor use impact to smaller, more compact areas.

See also
 Cascade Volcanoes
 List of volcanoes in the United States
 Indian Heaven Wilderness

Footnotes 
 [a]  Sources disagree on the exact number of vents; Harris (2005) says there are 48 vents, while Hildreth (2007) claims there are 52.

References

Sources 

 
 

 

 
 

Cascade Range
Volcanic fields of Washington (state)
Shield volcanoes
Subduction volcanoes
Cascade Volcanoes
Landforms of Skamania County, Washington
Polygenetic volcanic fields
Pleistocene volcanism
Holocene volcanism
Gifford Pinchot National Forest